Alexander Melvin Corbett (25 November 1855 – 7 October 1934) was an English first-class cricketer, who played one match for Yorkshire County Cricket Club.

Born in Aston Common, Rotherham, Yorkshire, England, Corbett went through his first-class career of one match without scoring a run or bowling a ball, but he took one catch. He played against the W. G. Grace led Gloucestershire at Bramall Lane, Sheffield in July 1881, a match won by the visitors by five wickets.

A pattern maker by trade, he played his club cricket with Elsecar C.C.

He died in Rotherham in October 1934, aged 78.

References

External links
Cricinfo Profile

1855 births
1934 deaths
Yorkshire cricketers
Cricketers from Rotherham
English cricketers
English cricketers of 1864 to 1889